Yarabad Mirbeyg (also Romanized as Yārābād Mīrbeyg; also known as Yārābād) is a village in Mirbag-e Shomali Rural District, in the Central District of Delfan County, Lorestan Province, Iran. At the 2006 census, its population was 1,491, in 309 families.

References 

Towns and villages in Delfan County